Lorenzo Fernández (May 20, 1900 – November 16, 1973), nicknamed El Gallego (The Galician), was a Spanish-born Uruguayan footballer. During his career, he played for Capurro, River Plate, Montevideo Wanderers FC and C.A. Peñarol. Fernández also played 31 times and scored 4 goals for the Uruguay national football team, with which he won the 1930 FIFA World Cup, the gold medal at the 1928 Summer Olympics, and the 1926 and 1935 Copa Americas. A center-half in the 2–3–5 footballing system, he once replaced Pedro Cea as an inside-left forward against Peru during a match in 1929 South American Championship and went on to score a hat-trick.

Honours

Club
Uruguayan Primera División: 1928, 1929, 1932 & 1935.
 Federación Uruguaya: 1923
 "La Tribuna Popular" Trophy: 1932
 José Piendibene Cup: 1929
 Mirurgia Cup: 1928
 Ricardo Pittaluga Cup: 1928
 Copa Aldao: 1928

International
 Uruguay
 South American Championship: 1926 Winner, 1935 Winner
 FIFA World Cup: 1930 Winner
 1928 Summer Olympics: 1928 Gold Medal
 Copa Newton: 1929 & 1930 Winner
 Copa Lipton: 1927 & 1929 Winner

References

External links

 1928 Summer Olympics Final
 
 National Appearances
 Part of Uruguays "Iron Curtain" Defence
 

1900 births
1973 deaths
Footballers from Redondela
Uruguayan footballers
Uruguay international footballers
Uruguayan football managers
Spanish footballers
Spanish football managers
Spanish emigrants to Uruguay
1930 FIFA World Cup players
Uruguayan Primera División players
Montevideo Wanderers F.C. players
Club Nacional de Football players
Peñarol players
Olympic footballers of Uruguay
Footballers at the 1928 Summer Olympics
Olympic gold medalists for Uruguay
FIFA World Cup-winning players
Peñarol managers
Olympic medalists in football
Copa América-winning players
Medalists at the 1928 Summer Olympics
Association football defenders